Anabasine is a pyridine and piperidine alkaloid found in the Tree Tobacco (Nicotiana glauca) plant, a close relative of the common tobacco plant (Nicotiana tabacum). It is a structural isomer of, and chemically similar to, nicotine. Its principal (historical) industrial use is as an insecticide.

Anabasine is present in trace amounts in tobacco smoke, and can be used as an indicator of a person's exposure to tobacco smoke.

Pharmacology 

Anabasine is a nicotinic acetylcholine receptor agonist. In high doses, it produces a depolarizing block of nerve transmission, which can cause symptoms similar to those of nicotine poisoning and, ultimately, death by asystole. In larger amounts it is thought to be teratogenic in swine.

The intravenous LD50 of anabasine ranges from 11 mg/kg to 16 mg/kg in mice, depending on the enantiomer.

Analogs
B. Bhatti, et al. made some higher potency sterically strained bicyclic analogs of anabasine:

2-(Pyridin-3-yl)-1-azabicyclo[3.2.2]nonane (TC-1698)
2-(Pyridin-3-yl)-1-azabicyclo[2.2.2]octane, 
and 2-(Pyridin-3-yl)-1-azabicyclo[3.2.1]octane.

See also
 Anatabine

References 

Pyridine alkaloids
Nicotinic agonists
Alkaloids found in Nicotiana
Plant toxin insecticides
Piperidine alkaloids
Plant toxins
3-Pyridyl compounds
2-Piperidinyl compounds